Roman Stolyar (born December 6, 1967) is a Russian composer, piano improviser and educator.

Career 

Born in Novosibirsk, Siberia, in a family of engineers, Stolyar graduated from Novosibirsk College of Music as a jazz pianist and from Novosibirsk State Concervatoire as a composer of contemporary and electronic music.

As an improviser, he has collaborated with Dominic Duval, William Parker, Vinny Golia, Stephen Nachmanovitch, Marco Eneidi, Weasel Walter, Susan Allen, Tanya Kalmanovitch, Oliver Lake, Assif Tsahar, Glen Hall, Thomas Buckner, Martin Kuchen, Ed Sarath, Jin Hi Kim, Ilia Belorukov, Sergey Letov and others.

His music has been released on labels Cadence Jazz, Electroshock Records, SoLyd, Ayler Records, NewFolder2, and Ermatell Records.

He is currently employed as an educator at Novosibirsk College of Music, and music director of Novosibirsk State Theatre "Globe". He is a member of the Russian Composers Union and member of the Advisory Council of International Society for Improvised Music.

His book Modern Improvisation: A Practical Guide for Piano was published in Russia in 2010.

Discography
Roman Stolyar - SAVJEST, TO FOLLOW (2022, Bomba Piter)
Roman Stolyar, Andrey Razin - BALLET SCENES FOR TWO PIANOS (2021, Bomba Piter)
Michaela Steinhauer, Alexey Kruglov, Roman Stolyar - CHANGES & CHOICES (2021, independent release)
Hung Mung & Roman Stolyar - ADVERCITY YIELDS FLAIR (2020, Discordian Records)
Nick Rubanov, Alexander Ragazanov, Roman Stolyar - RURARO (2020, Bomba Piter)
 Raphael Sudan, Roman Stolyar - RESTLESS (2017, Ermatell)
 Michaela Steinhauer, Alexey Kruglov, Roman Stolyar – TALKS AROUND MIDNIGHT (2016, Fancy Music)
 VocColors Quartet, Alexey Kruglov, Roman Stolyar, Andrey Razin, Oleg Yudanov – RUSSIAN AFFAIRS (2016, ArtBeat)
 Roman Stolyar, Alexye Nadzharov, Alexei Chichilin – NACHISTO ( 2016, Creative Sources)
 Roman Stolyar - THE BOSTON CASE (2014, FancyMusic)
 Glen Hall, Roman Stolyar, Vladimir Luchansky, Vladimir Dranitsa, Sergey Belichenko  - LIVE IN SIBERIA (2014, Tarsier Records)
 Alexey Kruglov, Roman Stolyar, Vladimir Dranitsa, Sergey Belichenko - STRUCTURE #54 (2014, FancyMusic)
 Roman Stolyar, Vladimir Luchansky - DUETS (2013, FancyMusic)
 Roman Stolyar, Ed Sarath - AMAZING BLUE (2012, Ermatell)
 Roman Stolyar, Susan Allen — TOGETHER (2011, independent release)
 Roman Stolyar, Dominic Duval — PARK WEST SUITE (2011, Cadence Jazz)
 Roman Stolyar, Alexey Lapin — DOUBLE SONATA (2011, SoLyd)
Sergey Mikhaylenko & XYZ Quartet — TRUMP CARD (2011, Ermatell/Jazzosophia)
 Lenny Sendersky, Roman Stolyar — EXTREME POINTS (2010, NewFolder2)
 Roman Stolyar — MISSA APOCRYPH (2010, Electroshock)
 Ilia Belorukov, Roman Stolyar, Andrey Popovsky, Alexander Funtikov — DOTS & LINES (2007, Ermatell)
 New Generation Quartet — DANCES (2007, Ayler)
 Susan Allen, Roman Stolyar, Sergey Belichenko — TRIALOG (2005, Ermatell)
 Roman Stolyar — STRAIGHT AND STRANGE (2003, Ermatell)
 Roman Stolyar — CREDO (2003, Electroshock)
 Denmark's Intuitive Music Conference — SOUND SCAPES (2002, Ermatell)
 New Generation Quartet — JOURNAL OF JAZZ IMMUNOLOGY (1996, Ermatell)

References 

Roman Stolyar's  personal web site
 Roman Stolyar at All About Jazz
 Review of ISIM Conference 2008
Advertisement of Roman Stolyar's concert at REDCAT.
Modern Improvisation: A Practical Guide for Piano - English edition

Russian composers
Russian male composers
Russian multi-instrumentalists
Novosibirsk Conservatory alumni
1967 births
Living people